Garcia is a Croatian film directed by Dejan Šorak. It was released in 1999.

External links
 

1999 films
Croatian drama films
1990s Croatian-language films